George William Ratterman (November 12, 1926 – November 3, 2007) was an American football player in the All-America Football Conference and the National Football League.

Early life
He was born in Cincinnati, Ohio, where he graduated from St. Xavier High School in 1944. He played college football at the University of Notre Dame from 1944 through 1946, primarily as a backup to quarterbacks Frank Dancewicz and Johnny Lujack.  He was the last of only four students in Notre Dame history to earn letters in four different sports (football, basketball, baseball, tennis).  Legendary football coach Frank Leahy called him "the greatest all-around athlete in the history of Notre Dame."

Professional football career
He played professional football with the Buffalo Bills of the AAFC from 1947 to 1949, when the league merged with the NFL.  In his first year, 1947, at the age of 20, Ratterman threw 22 touchdown passes, setting a professional football rookie record that stood for more than fifty years until broken by Peyton Manning in 1998.  He continued his career with the New York Yanks of the NFL in 1950 and 1951, the Montreal Alouettes of the Canadian Football League in 1951 and finished with the Cleveland Browns of the NFL from 1952 through 1956.  He led the NFL in TD passes in 1950 while playing for New York.  In 1956, he became the Browns' starting quarterback, succeeding Otto Graham, and was first player in the history of football to wear a radio receiver in his helmet, which allowed Cleveland Coach Paul Brown to call plays using a microphone instead of sending in messenger players for each play. Ratterman was featured on the cover of Sports Illustrated, October 8, 1956.  A leg injury on October 21, 1956, ended his football career.

Post-playing career activities

General counsel for the American Football League Players Association
He earned his law degree in 1956 and was admitted to practice in Ohio and Kentucky.  He acted as general counsel for the American Football League Players Association in the mid-1960s, when Jack Kemp was the president of the union.

Campaign for sheriff of Campbell County, Kentucky
On May 9, 1961, while campaigning as a candidate for sheriff of Campbell County, Kentucky, he was drugged with chloral hydrate and put in bed with stripper April Flowers in an attempt to blackmail him and force him to drop from the race.  The plot was uncovered, and publicity from the botched frame-up attempt catapulted him and his party to victory in the election.  While sheriff, with cooperation from federal agents and personal interest of then-U.S. Attorney General Robert F. Kennedy, he was able to rid the county, and particularly the city of Newport, of gambling, prostitution and vice businesses that had dominated the area since the Civil War.

Ratterman was, coincidentally, one in a relatively long line of Buffalo professional football quarterbacks to have entered politics: 1920s quarterback Tommy Hughitt, and 1960s quarterbacks Jack Kemp and Ed Rutkowski would also be elected to political positions; of them, only Ratterman did so for a constituency outside Buffalo.

Confessions of a Gypsy Quarterback
He is the author of a book, Confessions of a Gypsy Quarterback, Coward-McCann, 1962, containing hilarious anecdotes of his experiences and hi-jinks in professional football.  In the foreword, Pro Football Hall of Fame quarterback Otto Graham says Ratterman was the "best natural clown and comic I ever saw in professional football." In one story, during a game while Ratterman was in a game for the Browns and stern  Coach Brown was sending in the plays from the bench using his messenger guard system, Ratterman told the guard who came in with the play call to "go back and get another one" because Ratterman "didn't like that play."  The guard, a rookie named Joe Skibinski, obediently turned to run back to the bench and Coach Brown before Ratterman and other players stopped him.

He was an unsuccessful candidate for county judge and United States Congress in the 1960s.

Broadcasting career
He worked as a color commentator on TV and radio broadcasts of AFL and NFL football games for ABC-TV (1960–1964) and NBC-TV (1965–1973).  He was frequently paired with Jack Buck and Charlie Jones on broadcast teams.  He had the distinction of providing color analysis to Jim Simpson's play-by-play of Super Bowl I on Sunday, January 15, 1967 for the NBC Radio Network.  During half-time of the first NFL-AFL Championship Game at the Los Angeles Coliseum, Ratterman interviewed Dallas Cowboys quarterback Don Meredith and San Diego Chargers wide receiver Lance Alworth about their thoughts on the game's first half.

Death
Ratterman died in Centennial, Colorado, on November 3, 2007, from complications of Alzheimer's disease.  He and his wife of 59 years, Anne, had ten children.

References

External links
 databaseFootball: George Ratterman
 Professional Football Researchers Association: Mini-Bio: George Ratterman

1926 births
2007 deaths
Players of American football from Cincinnati
American Football League announcers
College football announcers
American football quarterbacks
Buffalo Bills announcers
Buffalo Bills (AAFC) players
Cleveland Browns players
Kentucky sheriffs
People from Campbell County, Kentucky
National Football League announcers
New York Yanks players
Notre Dame Fighting Irish football players
Notre Dame Fighting Irish men's basketball players
Notre Dame Fighting Irish baseball players
Notre Dame Fighting Irish men's tennis players
Basketball players from Cincinnati
Tennis players from Cincinnati
St. Xavier High School (Ohio) alumni
Neurological disease deaths in Colorado
Deaths from Alzheimer's disease
20th-century American politicians
Canadian football quarterbacks
Montreal Alouettes players
Catholics from Kentucky
American men's basketball players